Pool B of the 2016 Fed Cup Europe/Africa Zone Group I was one of four pools in the Europe/Africa zone of the 2016 Fed Cup. Four teams competed in a round robin competition, with the top team and the bottom team proceeding to their respective sections of the play-offs: the top team played for advancement to the World Group II Play-offs, while the bottom team faced potential relegation to Group II.

Standings

Round-robin

Georgia vs. South Africa

Great Britain vs. South Africa

Great Britain vs. Georgia

References

External links 
 Fed Cup website

B1